
Avant-Garde van Groeninge is a restaurant located in Eindhoven in the Netherlands. It is housed in the Philips Stadion, the home ground of soccer club PSV Eindhoven. It is a fine dining restaurant that is awarded one Michelin star in the period 2004–present.

GaultMillau awarded the restaurant 15 out of 20 points.

Owner and head chef of Avant-Garde van Groeninge is Johan van Groeninge.

The restaurant is a continuation of Michelin starred Brasserie de Eglantier in Hilvarenbeek. Chef Van Groeninge and his team hoped to bring the star with them to Eindhoven. This did not materialize and they lost the star. They had to wait till 2004 to receive the star again.

Avant-Garde van Groeninge is a member of Les Patrons Cuisiniers.

See also
List of Michelin starred restaurants in the Netherlands

References 

Restaurants in the Netherlands
Michelin Guide starred restaurants in the Netherlands
Restaurants in North Brabant
Buildings and structures in Eindhoven
Culture in Eindhoven